Hyphantria is a genus of tiger moths in the family Erebidae. The genus was erected by Thaddeus William Harris in 1841. The moths are primarily found in North and Central America. One species, Hyphantria cunea, was introduced in western, central and eastern Eurasia.

Species
 Hyphantria cunea (Drury, 1773)
 Hyphantria orizaba (Druce, 1897)
 Hyphantria panoezys (Dyar, 1916)
 Hyphantria penthetria Dyar, 1912
 Hyphantria pictipupa Fitch, 1857

References

Spilosomina
Moth genera